The Dufour effect is the energy flux due to a mass concentration gradient occurring as a coupled effect of irreversible processes, named after L. Dufour.  It is the reciprocal phenomenon to the Soret effect. The concentration gradient results in a temperature change. For binary liquid mixtures, the Dufour effect is usually considered negligible, whereas in binary gas mixtures the effect can be significant.

References

Thermodynamics